Seyfabad (also Romanized as Seyfābād) is a village in Seyfabad Rural District, in the Central District of Khonj County, Fars Province, Iran. At the 2006 census, its population was 621, in 132 families.

References 

Populated places in Khonj County